Ross Kelly is a Scottish TV presenter, who appeared on Lookaround, GMTV (1993-2000) and The Heaven and Earth Show.  Kelly was born in Galashiels, Scotland  and studied at the University of Edinburgh in language and literature.

In 1984, originally wanted to work for The Scotsman or The Edinburgh Evening News, however there were no open positions available. Kelly joined Central Television, joining on their trainee scheme, going on to become a full-time reporter. In 1987 Kelly joined Lookaround and became a reporter and presenter. In 1990 Kelly joined This Morning

In 1993 Kelly joined GMTV as a producer, but quickly become a relief presenter and reporter. In 1999 he was quiz master for BBC2 "Whose House"

In July 2000, Kelly left GMTV and went on to present The Heaven and Earth Show, Burn Your Bills, a Scottish Television Gameshow and again helped out on This Morning He appeared on Lily Savage's Blankety Blank in 2001.

References

1962 births
Living people
British reporters and correspondents
Scottish television presenters
Scottish television journalists
People from Galashiels
GMTV presenters and reporters
ITV regional newsreaders and journalists
Alumni of the University of Edinburgh